Buchsee is a lake in the Mecklenburgische Seenplatte district in Mecklenburg-Vorpommern, Germany. At an elevation of 58.9 m, its surface area is 0.089 km².

Lakes of Mecklenburg-Western Pomerania